Nong Theng Nakleng-pukhaothong ( or Nong and Teng, the Gangsters of Golden Mount) is a 2006 Thai comedy film starring Pongsak Pongsuwan and Choosak Eamsuk.

Plot
In 1920s Siam, Bunteng, a member of a likay performing troupe, is faced with the prospect of his art dying when he and his family are threatened with eviction by a businessman who hopes to build a movie theater on the site of their stage. At the same time, the first Hollywood film, Miss Suwanna of Siam, is being made on location in the country. Seeing film as a corruptive influence on traditional Siamese culture, Bunteng, with the help of his gangster friend, Nong, sets about to disrupt the filming and keep his family from being evicted.

Cast
 Pongsak Pongsuwan as Bunteng 	
 Choosak Eamsuk as Nong
 Isaree Soungcharern as Linchee
 Nikalaya Dhunlaya as Nuenchan
 Nui Choenyeun
 Petchtai Wongkamlao (cameo)

External links
 

2006 films
2006 comedy films
Thai comedy films
Thai-language films
Sahamongkol Film International films